Zeina Mickawy (born 17 October 1998 in Alexandria) is an Egyptian professional squash player. As of February 2018, she was ranked number 37 in the world.

References

1998 births
Living people
Egyptian female squash players
21st-century Egyptian women